Wolfgang Amadeus Mozart's Horn Concerto No. 4 in E-flat major, K. 495 was completed in 1786.

Structure 
The work is in three movements:

 Allegro moderato
 Romance (Andante cantabile)
 Rondo (Allegro vivace) 6/8
A typical performance duration of the concerto takes 16–18 minutes.

The manuscript, written in red, green, blue, and black ink, was formerly considered as a jocular attempt to rattle the intended performer, Mozart's friend Joseph Leutgeb. However, recently it was suggested that the multicolored score may also be a kind of "color code".

The last movement is a "quite obvious" example of the hunt topic, "in which the intervallic construction, featuring prominent tonic and dominant triads in the main melody, was to some degree dictated by the capability of the horn, and so was more closely allied with the original 'pure' characteristics of the 'chasse' as an open-air hunting call."

This concerto is one of Mozart's two horn concerti to have ripieno horns (horns included in the orchestra besides the soloist), though, in contrast to K. 417, the solo horn in this one duplicates the first ripieno horn's part in the tutti passages.

Discography
Given its duration (no more than 20 minutes), it is quite common to find this Horn Concerto with Mozart's other three.

Discography on modern instruments 
 1954: Dennis Brain (horn); Philharmonia Orchestra, Herbert Von Karajan (conductor), EMI
 1961: Alan Civil (horn); Philharmonia Orchestra, Otto Klemperer (conductor), EMI
 1964: Barry Tuckwell (horn); London Symphony Orchestra, Peter Maag (conductor), Decca
 1970: Gerd Seifert (horn); Berliner Philharmoniker, Herbert von Karajan (conductor), Deutsche Grammophon
 1972: Alan Civil (horn); Academy of St. Martin-in-the-Fields, Sir Neville Marriner (conductor), Philips
 1975: Peter Damm (horn); Academy of St. Martin in the Fields, Sir Neville Marriner (conductor), Philips
 1980: Günter Högner (horn); Wiener Philharmoniker, Karl Böhm (conductor), Deutsche Grammophon
 1984: Barry Tuckwell (horn & conductor); English Chamber Orchestra, Decca
 1985: Hermann Baumann (horn); St Paul Chamber Orchestra, Pinchas Zukerman (conductor), Philips
 1985: Michael Thompson (horn); Philharmonia Orchestra, Christopher Warren-Green (conductor), Nimbus
 1985: Francis Orval (horn); Brussels Festival Orchestra, Robert Janssens (conductor), Marcophon
 1987: Dale Clevenger (horn); Franz Liszt Chamber Orchestra, János Rolla (conductor), Sony
 1987: Radovan Vlatković (horn); English Chamber Orchestra, Jeffrey Tate (conductor), Warner
 1988: David Jolley (horn); Orpheus Chamber Orchestra, Deutsche Grammophon
 1993: Frank Lloyd (horn); Northern Sinfonia, Richard Hickox (conductor), Chandos
 1996: Luc Bergé (horn); Prima la Musica, Dirk Vermeulen (conductor), Eufoda
 1997: David Pyatt (horn); Academy of St. Martin in the Fields, Sir Neville Marriner (conductor), Warner
 2006: Johannes Hinterholzer (horn); Mozarteum Orchestra Salzburg, Ivor Bolton (conductor), Oehms
 2011: Alessio Allegrini (horn); Orchestra Mozart, Claudio Abbado (conductor), Deutsche Grammophon
 2018: Javier Bonet (horn); Munich Radio Orchestra, Hermann Baumann (conductor), ARSIS

Discography on period instruments 
 1974: Hermann Baumann (natural horn); Concentus Musicus Wien, Nikolaus Harnoncourt (conductor), Teldec
 1987: Anthony Halstead (natural horn); Hanover Band, Roy Goodman (conductor), Nimbus
 1990: Timothy Brown (natural horn); Orchestra of the Age of Enlightenment, Sigiswald Kuijken (conductor), Erato
 1993: Ab Koster (natural horn); Tafelmusik, Bruno Weil (conductor), Sony
 1994: Anthony Halstead (natural horn); Academy of Ancient Music, Christopher Hogwood (conductor), L'oiseau lyre
 2007: Teunis van der Zwart (natural horn); Freiburger Barockorchester, Gottfried von der Goltz, (conductor), Harmonia Mundi
 2007: Paul Van Zelm (natural horn); Combattimento Consort Amsterdam, Jan Willem De Vriend, (conductor), Etcetera
 2013: Roger Montgomery (natural horn); Orchestra of the Age of Enlightenment, Margaret Faultless (concert master/conductor), Signum 
 2015: Pip Eastop (natural horn); The Hanover Band, Anthony Halstead (conductor), Hyperion

In 1963 Flanders and Swann set the Rondo movement to words for their song "Ill Wind" from the album At the Drop of Another Hat.

References

External links

 

Horn concertos by Wolfgang Amadeus Mozart
Compositions in E-flat major
1786 compositions